Trachycarpus nanus is a species of flowering plant in the family Arecaceae. It is found only in China. Its natural habitat is subtropical or tropical moist lowland forests. It is threatened by habitat loss.

References

nanus
Flora of China
Endangered plants
Taxonomy articles created by Polbot
Taxobox binomials not recognized by IUCN